is a Japanese mixed martial artist currently competing in Pancrase's welterweight division. He is a former welterweight King of Pancrase.

Mixed martial arts career

Early career
Yamashita started his professional career in 2010. Except for his first bout, he fought only for Shooto.

Yamashita faced Yuki Okano on December 18, 2011 at Shooto: The Rookie Tournament 2011 Final for Shooto middleweight (168 lb) rookie title. He had his first career's defeat via unanimous decision after two rounds (20–18, 20–18, 20–18).

Pancrase
Yamashita faced Tamotsu Kitada on May 19, 2013 at Pancrase 247 in the semifinal match of Pancrase's Neo–Blood welterweight tournament. He won via TKO in the second round.

In the final on July 28, 2013 at Pancrase 250, Yamashita faced Toshikazu Suzuki. Suzuki defeated him via TKO early in the second round.

Coming off two wins after his setback against Suzuki, Yamashita faced Akihiro Murayama on August 10, 2014 at Pancrase 260 for the vacant welterweight King of Pancrase title. Yamashita won via unanimous decision after three rounds and became the new 170–pound King of Pancrase.

Yamashita defended his title against longtime mixed martial arts veteran Yuki Kondo on December 6, 2014 at Pancrase 263. He defeated Kondo via unanimous decision after three rounds.

Rizin
Yamashita signed with Rizin FF and made his promotional debut against Ryuichiro Sumimura at Rizin 25 on November 21, 2020. Yamashita lost the fight via split decision.

DEEP
Gota then faced Daichi Abe for the interim DEEP Welterweight Championship at DEEP 100 on February 21, 2021. He lost the fight via first-round technical knockout due to an injury.

Championships and accomplishments

Mixed martial arts
Pancrase
Welterweight King of Pancrase (one time; current)
One successful title defense
Neo–Blood welterweight tournament runner–up (2013)
Shooto
Shooto 168 lb rookie tournament runner–up (2011)
Gladiator
Gladiator Welterweight Championship (one time)
Two successful title defenses

Mixed martial arts record

|-
| Loss
| align=center| 15–11–1 (1)
| Daichi Abe
| TKO (finger injury)
| DEEP 100 Impact - 20th Anniversary
| 
| align=center| 1
| align=center| 2:34
| Tokyo, Japan
| 
|-
| Loss
| align=center| 15–10–1 (1)
| Ryuichiro Sumimura
| Decision (split)
| Rizin 25
| 
| align=center| 3
| align=center| 5:00
| Osaka, Japan
|
|-
| Win
| align=center| 15–9–1 (1)
| Kyohei Wakimoto
| Submission (armbar)
| Gladiator 012 in Osaka
| 
| align=center| 2
| align=center| 4:40
| Osaka, Japan
| 
|-
| Loss
| align=center| 14–9–1 (1)
| Hiromitsu Miura
| TKO (punches)
| Pancrase 309
| 
| align=center| 1
| align=center| 1:08
| Tokyo, Japan
| 
|-
| Draw
| align=center| 14–8–1 (1)
| Yun Jae Jung
| Draw
| Gladiator 009 in Osaka
| 
| align=center| 2
| align=center| 5:00
| Osaka, Japan
| 
|-
| Loss
| align=center| 14–8 (1)
| Daryl Lokuku
| Decision (unanimous)
| Grachan 37 x Gladiator 008
| 
| align=center| 3
| align=center| 5:00
| Osaka, Japan
| 
|-
| Win
| align=center| 14–7 (1)
| Makoto Maeda
| KO (head kick)
| Gladiator x Demolition Vol. 2
| 
| align=center| 1
| align=center| 0:13
| Sakai, Japan
| 
|-
| Loss
| align=center| 13–7 (1)
| Masayuki Hamagishi
| Submission (rear-naked choke)
| Grandslam 6 - Way of the Cage
| 
| align=center| 2
| align=center| 2:15
| Tokyo, Japan
| 
|-
| Win
| align=center| 13–6 (1)
| Hyung Seok Lee
| Decision (unanimous)
| Gladiator 004 in Wakayama
| 
| align=center| 2
| align=center| 5:00
| Wakayama, Japan
| 
|-
| Loss
| align=center| 12–6 (1)
| Kyung Pyo Kim
| Decision (majority)
| Gladiator 003 in Wakayama
| 
| align=center| 3
| align=center| 5:00
| Wakayama, Japan
| 
|-
| Win
| align=center| 12–5 (1)
| Jun Hee Moon
| Decision (unanimous)
| Gladiator 002 in Osaka
| 
| align=center| 3
| align=center| 5:00
| Osaka, Japan
| 
|-
| Win
| align=center| 11–5 (1)
| Yuta Nakamura
| Decision (unanimous)
| Gladiator 001 in Wakayama
| 
| align=center| 3
| align=center| 5:00
| Wakayama, Japan
| 
|-
| Loss
| align=center| 10–5 (1)
| Nelson Carvalho
| Submission (rear-naked choke)
| HEAT 37
| 
| align=center| 1
| align=center| 0:52
| Nagoya, Japan
| 
|-
| Loss
| align=center| 10–4 (1)
| Shingo Suzuki
| Submission (rear-naked choke)
| Pancrase 270
| 
| align=center| 2
| align=center| 3:56
| Tokyo, Japan
| 
|-
| Loss
| align=center| 10–3 (1)
| Shingo Suzuki
| TKO (punches)
| Pancrase 267
| 
| align=center| 2
| align=center| 2:22
| Tokyo, Japan
| 
|-
| Win
| align=center| 10–2 (1)
| Yuki Kondo
| Decision (unanimous)
| Pancrase 263
| 
| align=center| 3
| align=center| 5:00
| Tokyo, Japan
| 
|-
| Win
| align=center| 9–2 (1)
| Akihiro Murayama
| Decision (unanimous)
| Pancrase 260
| 
| align=center| 3
| align=center| 3:00
| Tokyo, Japan
| 
|-
| Win
| align=center| 8–2 (1)
| Kenta Takagi
| Decision (unanimous)
| Pancrase 258
| 
| align=center| 3
| align=center| 3:00
| Tokyo, Japan
| 
|-
| Win
| align=center| 7–2 (1)
| Akihiro Yamazaki
| Decision (majority)
| Pancrase 254
| 
| align=center| 2
| align=center| 5:00
| Osaka, Japan
| 
|-
| Loss
| align=center| 6–2 (1)
| Toshikazu Suzuki
| TKO (punches)
| Pancrase 250: 2013 Neo–Blood Tournament Finals
| 
| align=center| 2
| align=center| 0:26
| Tokyo, Japan
| 
|-
| Win
| align=center| 6–1 (1)
| Tamotsu Kitada
| TKO (punches)
| Pancrase 247
| 
| align=center| 2
| align=center| 4:01
| Tokyo, Japan
| 
|-
| Win
| align=center| 5–1 (1)
| Shigeaki Kusayanagi
| Decision (split)
| Pancrase: Progress Tour 12
| 
| align=center| 2
| align=center| 5:00
| Tokyo, Japan
| 
|-
| NC
| align=center| 4–1 (1)
| Seiki Ryo
| No contest (leg injury)
| Pancrase: Progress Tour 10
| 
| align=center| 1
| align=center| 1:45
| Tokyo, Japan
| 
|-
| Win
| align=center| 4–1
| Kosei Kubota
| TKO (punches)
| Pancrase: Progress Tour 5
| 
| align=center| 1
| align=center| 2:37
| Tokyo, Japan
| 
|-
| Loss
| align=center| 3–1
| Yuki Okano
| Decision (unanimous)
| Shooto: The Rookie Tournament 2011 Final
| 
| align=center| 2
| align=center| 5:00
| Tokyo, Japan
| 
|-
| Win
| align=center| 3–0
| Yasushi Kato
| Submission (kimura)
| Shooto: Gig West 13
| 
| align=center| 1
| align=center| 3:22
| Osaka, Japan
| 
|-
| Win
| align=center| 2–0
| Toshiyuki Yoshikawa
| Decision (unanimous)
| Shooto: Border: Season 3: Spring Thunder
| 
| align=center| 2
| align=center| 5:00
| Osaka, Japan
| 
|-
| Win
| align=center| 1–0
| Tomoyuki Suda
| TKO (punch)
| GCM: Demolition West
| 
| align=center| 1
| align=center| 1:16
| Osaka, Japan
|

References

1989 births
Living people
People from Amagasaki
Japanese male mixed martial artists
Welterweight mixed martial artists